= Järstorp =

Swedish locality in Jönköping County

Coordinates: 57.803°N 14.114°E

Järstorp (Swedish pronunciation: [ˈjæ̌ʂːtɔrp]) is a locality situated in Jonköping, Jönköping County, Sweden.

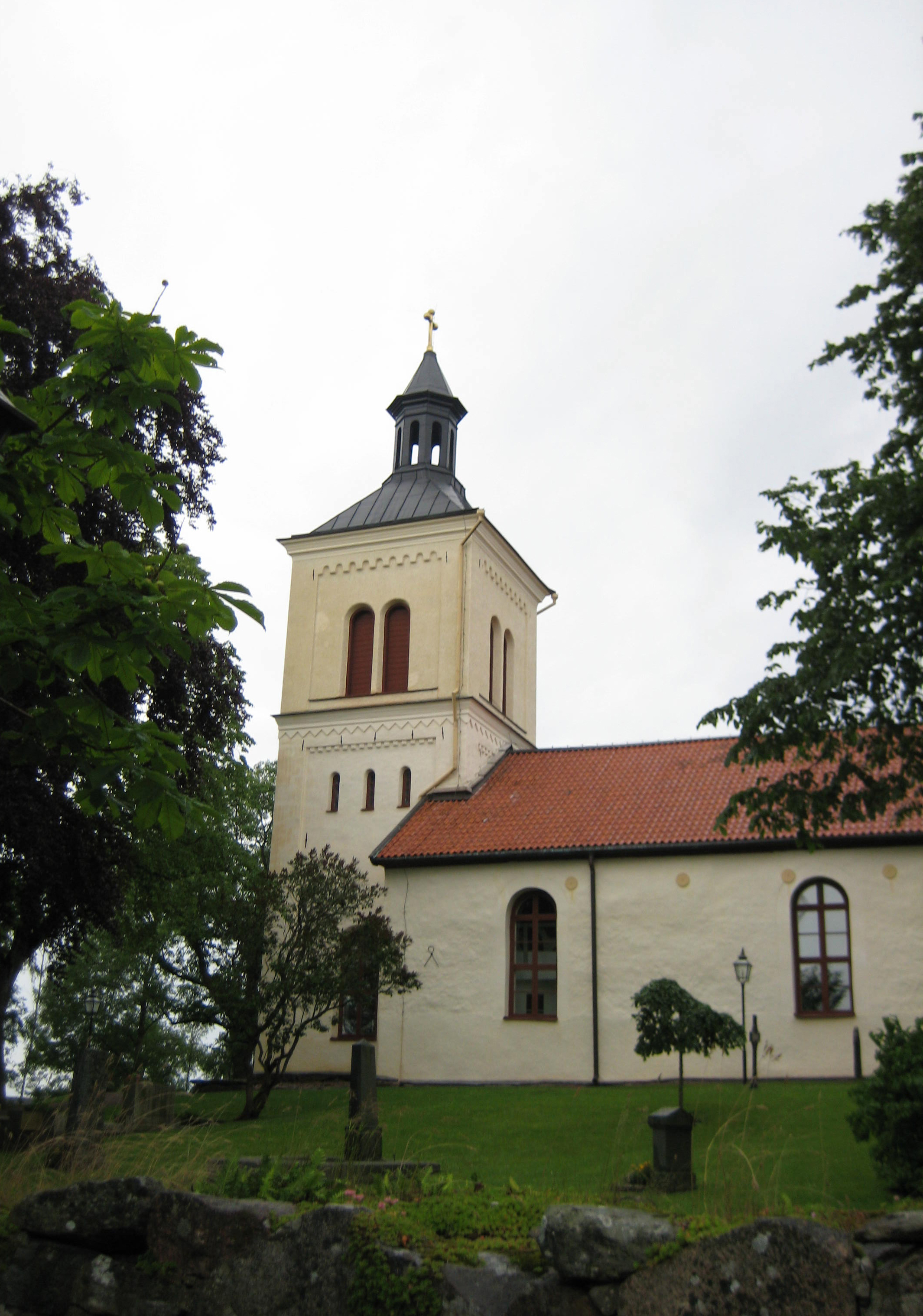
The church of Järstorp
